Lucas Poletto Costa (born 29 March 1995) is a Brazilian professional footballer who plays as a forward for Criciúma.

Career
Born in Belo Horizonte, Poletto represented Internacional, Figueirense and Italian club Milan as a youth before moving to Santos B in early 2016. Although he was registered for the Copa Paulista tournament, he did not get any playing time.

On 13 April 2017, Poletto signed with Grêmio. He made his first team debut on 19 November, replacing Dionathã in a 1–0 defeat against Santos FC in Série A. 7 days later, he scored the equaliser in a 1–1 draw against Atlético Goianiense from a Rafael Thyere. On 5 January 2018, Poletto's contract was extended till June. On 12 July, he was released by the club.

On 15 September 2018, Poletto moved abroad and joined Greek Football League club Apollon Larissa. On 22 November 2018, he scored his first goal for the club in an astonishing 4-3 away win against Iraklis.  Three days later he scored with a beautiful finesse shot in a 2-0 home win against Aittitos Spata, which cemented his team's position on top of the league table.  On 19 January 2019, he scored the equalizer in a 1-1 home draw against Volos. 

On 12 June 2019, he signed a contract with top tier club Xanthi.

Career statistics

Honours
Levadiakos
Super League 2: 2021–22

References

External links

1995 births
Living people
Association football forwards
Brazilian footballers
Campeonato Brasileiro Série A players
Grêmio Foot-Ball Porto Alegrense players
Football League (Greece) players
Super League Greece 2 players
Apollon Larissa F.C. players
Levadiakos F.C. players
Brazilian expatriate footballers
Brazilian expatriate sportspeople in Greece
Footballers from Belo Horizonte